Clock is a timekeeping mobile app available since the initial launch of the iPhone and iPhone OS 1 in 2007, with a version later released for iPads with iOS 6, and Macs with the release of macOS Ventura. The app consists of a world clock, alarm, stopwatch, and timer. 

The app icon shows the device's current time when viewed from the home screen, making it one of the only iOS apps with a dynamic icon (the other being Calendar).

Features

World Clock 
The World Clock allows users to access the current time of different cities of their choosing from around the world. More locations can be added by tapping the plus icon at the top of the screen, or removed by swiping left on a location and clicking the delete button. On all versions except iOS, the world clock will also display the sunrise and sunset time for each location, as well as a map which displays where it is currently night and day.

Alarms 
Alarms allow users to create new alarms, turn existing alarms on or off, or delete them.  Alarms will play a chime and vibration once completed, which the user can choose from their music or ringtone libraries, and can be set to repeat on particular days of the week. 

Users can also set a sleep schedule, which notifies users to wind down when their set bedtime is approaching and sets the device into sleep focus mode. It also creates a wake up alarm, which has a number of unique chimes available. This feature integrates with the Health application to track sleep data.

Stopwatch 
The Stopwatch allows users to measure how long events take, and pause, reset, or use the stopwatch's lap feature. Green and red type indicate the best and worst laps. Since iOS 10, an analouge stopwatch face can accessed by swiping to the left. Additionally, the watchOS version of stopwatch also includes graph and hybrid faces.

Timer 
The user can set a timer to count down from a specific time. When the timer reaches zero, a chime will be sounded chosen from the user's ringtone library. On watchOS, there are a number of pre-set timer intervals available for faster access, and multiple timers can be set at one time. 

As of iOS 11, the timer can be set from 1 second up to 23 hours, 59 minutes, and 59 seconds.

References 

IOS
IOS software
IOS-based software made by Apple Inc.